Fowler Theatre is a historic theater located at Fowler, Benton County, Indiana. It was built in 1940, and is a one-story, Art Deco style movie theater. It is a red brick building on a concrete foundation and features the original marquee.  The interior has Art Deco and Art Moderne decorative elements.

It was listed on the National Register of Historic Places in 2004.

References

External links

Theatres on the National Register of Historic Places in Indiana
Theatres completed in 1940
Streamline Moderne architecture in the United States
Art Deco architecture in Indiana
Buildings and structures in Benton County, Indiana
National Register of Historic Places in Benton County, Indiana
Tourist attractions in Benton County, Indiana
1940 establishments in Indiana
Reportedly haunted locations in Indiana